Cunurana (possibly from Aymara for a variety of potato of the qhini group) is a mountain in the La Raya mountain range in the Andes of Peru, about  high. It is situated in the Puno Region, Melgar Province, Santa Rosa District. Cunurana lies south east of La Raya mountain pass near the road and railway that connect Cusco and Juliaca.

References

Mountains of Peru
Mountains of Puno Region